Off-Ramp is a fictional character in the DC Comics universe who first appeared in the Young Heroes in Love series.

Fictional character biography
The character Off-Ramp first appeared (like all members of the Young Heroes) in a DC House promotional ad that listed all the heroes as well as who they loved. For Off-Ramp, his caption simply said "You don't want to know what Off-Ramp loves..." which began the mystery of just what exactly Off-Ramp loved that was so different from everyone else.

Surly, foul-mouthed, and a little short-tempered, Off-Ramp is one of the more animated heroes on the team. In addition to being a costumed superhero, he was also an amateur racer. Off-Ramp spent most of his free time lovingly restoring his prized hot rod Roadshow, which he could make "fly" by using his power to create invisible spatial warps directly in front of the car and move it to different points through the air. At first, it seemed like what he "loved" was his car, and while that may be true to a degree, it wasn't exactly what the writers were referring to. 

Throughout the Young Heroes in Love series, Off-Ramp continually expressed how much he admired his team's leader, Hard Drive, even at one point calling him "captivating". He even mentioned this to Samira, who was living in Italy at the time with his son, all the while a small image of Hard Drive could be seen in his pupils. Given his leader's power of mental persuasion, it is difficult to tell whether or not Off-Ramp actually had a homosexual desire for him, or if he was just being manipulated. At this point, however, the reader learns that there is a distinct possibility of Off-Ramp being gay, despite the fact that he apparently fathered a child (whom he loves a great deal and visits somewhat regularly using his powers).

Later in the series tensions began to rise between Off-Ramp and teammate Frostbite, when small hints were dropped between the two of a possible attraction. Eventually, Off-Ramp admitted to having feelings for him, and Frostbite in turn said he was bisexual (as evidence by his relationship to teammate Bonfire). Though the series ended not long after this, it is later revealed in a future scenario that the two spent several years living together before eventually separating.

Powers and abilities
Off-Ramp can create rifts that allow himself and others (including his car) to travel just about anywhere. The extent of this power (how large the rifts can become and how far he can travel) are never fully revealed, and Off-Ramp himself has said even he doesn't even fully understand it. The above-mentioned future scenario indicates Off-Ramp gains the ability to travel through time and not just space.

References

External links
Gay League Profile
Off-Ramp Profile

Comics characters introduced in 1997
DC Comics LGBT superheroes
DC Comics metahumans
DC Comics characters who can teleport
Fictional gay males
Fictional drivers